Asprey is a surname. Notable people with the surname include:

 Kenneth Asprey (1905–1993), judge of the New South Wales Court of Appeal
 Bill Asprey (born 1936), English former football player and manager
 Larned B. Asprey (1919–2005), American chemist
 Robert B. Asprey (1923–2009), American military historian and author
 Winifred Asprey (1917–2007), American mathematician and computer scientist